The 1984 Colorado State Rams football team represented Colorado State University in the Western Athletic Conference during the 1984 NCAA Division I-A football season. In their third season under head coach Leon Fuller, the Rams compiled a 3–8 record.

Schedule

Roster

References

Colorado State
Colorado State Rams football seasons
Colorado State Rams football